Usson-en-Forez (literally Usson in Forez) is a commune in the Loire department in central France.

Population

Personalities
Lazarite priest Jean-Claude Faveyrial (1813–1893), author of the first book on the history of Albania.

See also
Communes of the Loire department

References

Communes of Loire (department)